The Haruhi Suzumiya video games have been published by Namco Bandai Games, Banpresto, Kadokawa Shoten, and Sega. The games revolve around Haruhi Suzumiya, a high school girl who is obsessed with the supernatural. To find the supernatural, she forms the SOS Brigade to investigate mysterious happenings with four other members: Kyon, Yuki Nagato, Mikuru Asahina, and Itsuki Koizumi. Games have been released on the PlayStation 2, PlayStation 3, Wii, PlayStation Portable, and Nintendo DS, as well as mobile devices. The series features several genres including adventure games, visual novels, and a music video game. The series debuted in Japan on December 27, 2007 with Suzumiya Haruhi no Yakusoku. The series contains eight released games, the latest of which being Suzumiya Haruhi-chan no Mahjong released in July 2011.

Video games

References

External links
Suzumiya Haruhi no Yakusoku official website 
Suzumiya Haruhi no Tomadoi official website 
Suzumiya Haruhi no Gekidō official website 
Suzumiya Haruhi no Heiretsu and Suzumiya Haruhi no Chokuretsu official website 
Suzumiya Haruhi no Tsuisou official website 

Video games
Japan-exclusive video games
Haruhi Suzumiya video games
Haruhi Suzumiya video games
Haruhi Suzumiya